Asian Viewers Television Awards, also known as AVTA, is an annual award show event held in London which honours the best of Asian Television. Helmed by Rajan Singh, it was first awarded in 2014.

History
First held in 2014, the event is helmed by Rajan Singh. It is held annually in London. The nominations and winners are decided on the basis of votes received by the viewers.

Indian actor and host Karan Tacker has been hosting the event since the past six years.

Ceremonies

Winners

Male Actor Of The Year

Female Actor Of The Year

Supporting Actor Of The Year

Soap Of The Year

Reality Programme Of The Year

Best Of British

Channel Awards

News Presenter Of The Year

Lifetime Achievement Award
 2018
Javed Hussain

See also

List of Asian television awards

References

Awards established in 2014
Television in Asia
Indian television awards
Pakistani television awards